Matthew Golding (born 30 December 1980) is a former Australian rules footballer who played with Adelaide in the Australian Football League (AFL). He started his career at the Reynella Football Club and then went on to playing footy for Glenelg and then the Adelaide Crows, After leaving the AFL, Golding continued his career at his original club Glenelg and played 96 games for them, before crossing to Edwardstown in 2005. He remained with Edwardstown until 2010, when he joined Noarlunga.

References

External links
 
 

Adelaide Football Club players
Glenelg Football Club players
Australian rules footballers from Victoria (Australia)
1980 births
Living people
Reynella Football Club players